Coalbed Mountain is an ice-free mountain rising to  at Robison Peak located between Cycle Glacier and Rim Glacier in the eastern Head Mountains of Victoria Land. So named by the Advisory Committee on Antarctic Names in 2007 in association with coal beds discovered in rock strata of the mountain.

References

Mountains of Victoria Land